Wolff Wilhelm Lowenthal ( – ) was a silesian-born, naturalized French Doctor of Medicine.

Born in Rybnik, Province of Silesia, now Poland after graduating from the University of Berlin, Lowenthal (or Löwenthal, with the umlaut), went to the Caucasus to continue his medical research. At the same time, he was Professor at the University of Geneva, in its branch at the Lausanne, Switzerland.

He corresponded regularly with the Central Literary Bureau in Berlin. On 17 June 1878, he had an important audience with Victor Hugo, to great public acclaim, where he pledged himself to France as his home country. In the Congrès littéraire international de 1878, held at Théâtre du Châtelet, in 1879.

After that meeting, where he met Georges Maillard, they met again many years later, when Maillard retranslated the first series of the Association littéraire artistique internationale an organisation that was set up after, and in honour to, the Peace Declaration of World War I.

History
In Berlin he buoyed 1881 together with his brother Salo the publishing company Adressbuch-Verlag, then named Sozietät der Berliner Bürger-Zeitung W. & S. Loewenthal (formerly D. Collin). 1895, one year after his death, the publishing company has been sold.

 1879. He was awarded the decoration as an Officer of the Academy.
 À Berlin, il achète le Bürgerzeitung et devient copropriétaire du Berliner Adressbuch Vertag (Bottin mondain).
 Il est en même temps copropriétaire à Berlin, de la Sté d’édition et de typographie Wilhelm et Salo LOEWENTHAL qu’il fonde avec son frère. 
 Membre du Comité exécutif du Bureau de l’Association littéraire et artistique internationale, depuis sa fondation à Paris en 1878 (fonction qu’il occupait encore en 1889) Wolf Wilhelm LOEWENTHAL prend une part active à la conférence qui s’ouvre à Berne en 1883 pour élaborer et voter un projet de « convention pour constituer une Union générale pour la protection des droits des auteurs sur les œuvres littéraires et manuscrites », conférence dont les travaux aboutiront à la Convention internationale de Berne en 1886.
 Il prend part à des recherches sur le choléra avec Robert KOCH, et  poursuit des travaux  avec Victor André CORNIL à Paris  (deux de ses cinq  filles sont nées à Neuilly sur Seine : Hedwige, en 1883, et Suzanne, en 1886).

In 1886, he received 16 certificates in medicine from the University of Heidelberg, equivalent to a Frenchbaccalaureat or roughly an English Bachelor of Science.
In 1887 he was awarded as a Doctor of Medicine, with his thesis entitled .
Le 6 June 1889, sans qu’on sache ce qui s’ensuivit, de nombreux quotidiens français – dont certains sous le titre « l’affaire LOEWENTHAL » – font état de l’octroi par le ministre de la marine à W. LOEWENTHAL « en instance de naturalisation française » d’une « commission temporaire de médecin auxiliaire de la marine, à titre étranger », en vue de lui permettre de se rendre en mission au Tonkin, à la demande de l’administration des colonies, pour y expérimenter « l’action parasiticide immédiate du Salol sur les microbes du choléra ».  – W. LOEWENTHAL en avait au préalable testé les effets sur lui-même par l'absorption quotidienne de 10 grammes, sans autre accident que des urines foncées en couleur. Il avait, après cette expérience in vitro, essayé de guérir des cobayes et des souris rendus cholériques par le procédé de Robert Koch.
1890, he went to Argentina, to organise the colony there, under the control of the Jewish Colonization Association (JCA), run by Baron Maurice de Hirsch. Hirsch had already corresponded with Salomon Goldschmidt, the president of the Alliance Israélite Universelle. Their aim was to install Lowenthal as a rabbi in the colony, under the Grand Rabbi Zadoc Kahn, in Paris.

But differences of views between Loewenthal and Baron Hirsch meant this never came about, and they agreed to separate in November 1891. It's well understood, from banking records, that Lowenthal was in Berlin in 1891, but then went to Brussels. A colony was established, called Moisés Ville, the first colony of the JCA.

Death
It has been proven by banking records that Lowenthal died in the age of 44 in Berlin, after leaving Brussels. Susanne was 8 years old. She survived the Shoah.

Children 
 Käthe Loewenthal (1878–1942), Painter
 Gertraud
 Agnes
 Hedwig, * 1883 in Neuilly sur Seine
 Susanne Ritscher, Painter, * 1886 in Neuilly sur Seine

Legacy
In the colony, Lowenthal's name graces the principal thoroughfare.

References

External links
 Wilhelm Lowenthal at gallicia.fr

19th-century French physicians
19th-century Polish physicians